Leonard Charles Green (January 6, 1933 – January 6, 2019) was an American professional baseball player. The outfielder played in Major League Baseball (MLB) for 12 seasons for the Baltimore Orioles (1957–59; 1964), Washington Senators/Minnesota Twins (1959–64), Los Angeles Angels (1964), Boston Red Sox (1965–66) and Detroit Tigers (1967–68).

Early life 
Green was born in Detroit, Michigan, and attended Pershing High School.

Career
His career began with the Orioles' farm system in 1955 after service in the United States Army. After three trials with Baltimore, including most of the  season, he was traded to the Senators in May 1959 for  American League Rookie of the Year Albie Pearson. Green later was the regular center fielder for the 1965 Red Sox.

Green wasn't around for the pennant drive or postseason as the Tigers unconditionally released him in July of that year.
 
Over his career, Green was a .267 hitter (788-for-2,956) with 47 home runs and 253 RBI in 1,136 games, including 138 doubles, 27 triples, 78 stolen bases, and a .351 on-base percentage. He recorded a .984 fielding percentage playing at all three outfield positions.

Later life
Green died on January 6, 2019, which was his 86th birthday.

References

External links

Lenny Green at SABR (Baseball BioProject)
Venezuelan Professional Baseball League

1933 births
2019 deaths
African-American baseball players
Baltimore Orioles players
Baseball players from Detroit
Boston Red Sox players
Columbus Foxes players
Detroit Tigers players
Hawaii Islanders players
Industriales de Valencia players
Los Angeles Angels players
Major League Baseball outfielders
Minnesota Twins players
Rochester Red Wings players
San Antonio Missions players
Pershing High School alumni
Toledo Mud Hens players
Vancouver Mounties players
Washington Senators (1901–1960) players
Wichita Indians players
20th-century African-American sportspeople
21st-century African-American people